Coco's Kitchen' is a restaurant in Zona Romántica, Puerto Vallarta, in the Mexican state of Jalisco.

Description
Lonely Planet says, "At this popular brunch spot south of the river, tables are sprinkled on a ceramic-tiled patio beneath a stilted terracotta roof in a shady bar-side garden. Dishes range from carnitas (braised pulled pork) and green-chili burritos to a range of quesadillas and salads, eggs Benedict, chilaquiles, French toast and pecan waffles, executed with aplomb and served with a smile." In 2016, Ondine Cohane of The New York Times wrote, "Off-duty chefs, artists, local families and Puerto Vallarta insiders head to Coco’s Kitchen for brunch. Join them in the courtyard garden over a plate of huevos rancheros, French toast stuffed with queso and marmalade, and churro hot cakes, with a cup of café con leche."

History
Coco's Kitchen is operated by Coco Iñiguez and her daughter Vanessa Villegas. The restaurant has participated in Restaurant Week and hosted musician Kim Kuzma.

See also

 List of restaurants in Mexico

References

External links

 

Restaurants in Jalisco
Zona Romántica